John "Jack" Hogan (1 January 1881 – 15 November 1945) was a New Zealand rugby football player who represented New Zealand in both rugby union and rugby league as well as being a national champion in water polo.

Early life
Hogan was born in Wanganui in 1881. He received his education at the Wanganui Marist Brothers' School. He was an all-round athlete and rowed for the Aramoho Rowing Club.

Rugby union career
Hogan was a Wing Forward who played rugby union for the Kaierau club before being first selected to represent Wanganui in 1903. He also played water polo and was part of the Wanganui team which won the 1905 national title.

In 1907 Hogan was selected for the All Blacks side that toured Australia. Hogan was hampered by injuries on tour and was restricted to just two games against Queensland.

In 1908 he appeared for Wanganui in a 6–9 loss against the Anglo-Welsh tourists before retiring from rugby union at the end of the year.

Rugby league career
Hogan later began playing rugby league and represented Wanganui. In 1913 Hogan was selected for New Zealand and he again toured Australia. The side played in no test matches while on tour, instead playing matches against New South Wales and Queensland.

References

New Zealand rugby league players
New Zealand national rugby league team players
1881 births
1945 deaths
New Zealand rugby union players
New Zealand international rugby union players
Rugby league second-rows
North Island rugby union players
New Zealand male water polo players
Wanganui rugby union players
New Zealand male rowers
Wanganui rugby league team players